Tsiárta is a mountain in Tsada village in the Paphos District of Cyprus, situated at 605 m elevation. It is east of Melissóvounos. The highest part is located 613 m above sea level. It is near Asprovounaro. The average annual rainfall is 572 millimeters. The wettest month is January, with an average of 123 mm of precipitation. The driest month is August, with 2 mm of precipitation. The terrain around Tsiárta is mainly hilly.

References 

Paphos District
Mountains of Cyprus